Ferdinand David may refer to:
 Ferdinand David (musician) (1810–1873), German violinist and composer
 Ferdinand David (politician) (1824–1883), Quebec politician